The coxless four event was a rowing event conducted as part of the Rowing at the 1964 Summer Olympics programme.

Medallists

Results

Heats

The top crew in each heat advanced to the final, with all others sent to the repechages.

Repechages

The top finisher in each of the three repechages joined the finalists.  The second and third place finishers competed in a consolation final for 7th-12th places.  All other crews were eliminated.

Consolation final
The consolation final determined places from 7th to 12th.

Final

References

Sources
 

Rowing at the 1964 Summer Olympics